Defence Islands are an island group of the Andaman Islands. It belongs to the South Andaman administrative district, part of the Indian union territory of Andaman and Nicobar Islands.

Geography
The islands belongs to the Defence Group and lies in the sound of Jirkatang.
at their southern islands, there is a natural harbour called Port Campbell.

Administration
Politically, Defence Island, along neighboring islands, is part of Ferrargunj Taluk.

References 

South Andaman district
Islands of South Andaman district
Archipelagoes of the Andaman and Nicobar Islands
Bay of Bengal
Uninhabited islands of India